Pekka Laksola (born May 25, 1964) is a Finnish ice hockey coach. He played a long career for Tappara of the Finnish SM-liiga and later also for Berlin Capitals in Germany and Hockey Club de Reims in France.  He also represented Finland men's national ice hockey team three times in the ice hockey World Championships.

Honors
 Finnish SM-liiga championship: 1984, 1987, 1988, 1989
 French championship: 2000 (player), 2002 (head coach)
 French league All-star team: 2000 
 French Coach of the Year Award: 2002

References

External links 

1964 births
Living people
Tappara players
Finnish ice hockey defencemen
Ice hockey people from Tampere